These are playoff results for the current incarnation of the American Basketball Association (ABA).

Results

2000-2001

2001-2002

2003-2004

2004-2005

2005-2006

Wild card round
Rochester Razorsharks (1) received bye to Bracket One Quarterfinal
Indiana Alley Cats (2) received bye to Bracket Two Quarterfinal
San Jose Skyrockets (3) received bye to Bracket One Quarterfinal
SoCal Legends (4) received bye to Bracket Two Quarterfinal
Maryland Nighthawks (5) received bye to Bracket Two Quarterfinal
Pittsburgh Xplosion (6) received bye to Bracket One Quarterfinal
Atlanta Vision (7) received bye to Bracket One Quarterfinal
Harlem Strong Dogs (8) received bye to Bracket Two Quarterfinal
Newark Express (9) received bye to Bracket One Quarterfinal
Bellingham Slam (10) defeated Tacoma Navigators (22) 134-116
Toledo Ice (11) defeated Detroit Wheels (21) 132-130
Montreal Matrix (12) defeated Ohio Aviators (23) 140-83
Strong Island Sound (13) defeated Birmingham Magicians (19) 97-95
Beijing Aoshen Olympian (14) defeated Fresno Heatwave (20) 134-82
Buffalo Rapids (15) defeated Boston Frenzy (16) 133-88
Los Angeles Aftershock (18) defeated Orange County Buzz (17) 91-86

2006-2007

Wild card round
Vermont Frost Heaves (1) received bye to Bracket One Quarterfinal
Jacksonville Jam (2) received bye to Bracket Two Quarterfinal
Texas Tycoons (3) received bye to Bracket Two Quarterfinal
Rochester Razorsharks (4) received bye to Bracket One Quarterfinal
Arkansas Aeros (5) received bye to Bracket One Quarterfinal
Minnesota Ripknees (6) received bye to Bracket Two Quarterfinal
Beijing Aoshen Olympian (7) received bye to Bracket Two Quarterfinal
Bellingham Slam (8) received bye to Bracket One Quarterfinal
Quad City Riverhawks (9) defeated Sauk Valley Rollers (17) 100-86
Wilmington Sea Dawgs (10) defeated Orlando Aces (22) 119-103
Mississippi Miracles (11) defeated Waco Wranglers (23) 131-119
Buffalo Silverbacks (12) received bye to Bracket Two Quarterfinal
Strong Island Sound (13) defeated Quebec City Kebekwa (16) 108-97
Detroit Panthers (14) defeated Peoria Kings (18) 134-125
San Diego Wildcats (15) defeated Gallup Outlaws (20) 133-106
Hollywood Fame (19) defeated Maywood Buzz (21) 143-124

2007-2008

Wild card round
Vermont Frost Heaves (1) received bye to Bracket One Quarterfinal
Manchester Millrats (2) received bye to Bracket Two Quarterfinal
San Diego Wildcats (3) received bye to Bracket Two Quarterfinal
Texas Tycoons (4) received bye to Bracket One Quarterfinal
Quebec City Kebekwa (6) received bye to Bracket One Quarterfinal
Atlanta Vision (7) received bye to Bracket Two Quarterfinal
Long Beach Breakers (8) defeated Maywood Buzz (12) 120-102
Montreal Royal (9) received bye to Bracket Two Quarterfinal
Jersey Express (10) received bye to Bracket Two Quarterfinal
San Francisco Rumble (11) defeated Orange County Gladiators (5) 132-126

2008-2009

2009-2010

Note:  Finals was a best of 3 series.
Note:  ABA did not release the game results for the first round or the winners of the regional first round tournaments.

2010-11

American Basketball Association (2000–present)
American Basketball Association (2000–present) events